The Bulgarian mafia is a series of organized crime elements originating from Bulgaria.

Organized crime groups and activities
Modern organized crime is associated with the early 1990s, when weak power and continuous change of governments during Bulgaria's transition to democracy created conditions for economic and power groups to flourish. Bulgarian organized crime groups are involved in a wide range of activities, including drug trafficking, cigarette smuggling, human trafficking, prostitution, illicit antiquities trafficking, extortion (often under the cover of ostensible security and insurance companies), racketeering, various financial crimes, car theft and the arms trade. Bulgarian organized crime groups mainly use security and insurance companies such as SIC and VIS as fronts for criminal activities.

In 2020, the Italian police, together with the Bulgarian police, dismantled a Bulgarian gang that operated mainly in the Italian region of Tuscany, but also in Bulgaria. The gang was specialized in theft, and was found responsible for more than 40 thefts in the time period between September 2018 and April 2020. According to the investigations the gang was a well-structured and organized criminal group. Still, according to the Italian police, the Bulgarian mafia is among the most dangerous foreign criminal groups operating in Italy, and it was reported that they would be cooperating with the 'Ndrangheta.

Drug trafficking organizations run by Bulgarian nationals have been investigated in across US, especially in Los Angeles and Tampa. These groups deal with the import of cocaine and multi-thousand doses of ecstasy into the United States. Most members of these were imprisoned in the U.S. There, Bulgarian nationals are identified for falsification of IDs, organized bank fraud, drug trafficking, mortgage fraud, pimping, money laundering, extortion, arms dealing, loan sharking, pornography credit card fraud and alien smuggling.

Contract killings
Since the fall of communism in 1989, there have been more than 150 high rank heads mafia-style contract killings in Bulgaria, frequently perpetrated in the centre of the capital, Sofia, in broad daylight. There has been at most 1 conviction in these cases to date, though sources differ. This is frequently blamed on the alleged widespread corruption at all levels of the Bulgarian judicial system including the Prosecutor's Office.

The cost of contract killings carried out by highly professional snipers has been estimated at £5,000-£50,000 The more important the more expensive one worth.

Some of the most prominent assassination targets of recent years (in chronological order):
 Vasil Iliev - Founder of VIS1 and VIS2. Ambushed by an unknown killer on his way to Club "Mirage" on 25 April 1995.
Andrey Lukanov - former Bulgarian prime minister (1990). Killed on 2 October 1996.
Ivo Karamanski, a.k.a. "The Godfather" - Shot by a drunk acquaintance at a birthday party in Sofia on 20 December 1998.
 Pantyu Pantev, a.k.a. "Polly" - Drug smuggler, initially affiliated with VIS, later with SIC. He was rumoured to have stolen half a ton of cocaine from the Russian or Colombian mafia. Several assassination attempts, including one with a missile, all attempts for different reasons from different rivals. He was shot dead on the Caribbean island of Aruba on 9 March 2001.
 Iliya Pavlov - Founder of Multigroup and the wealthiest individual in Bulgaria. There is no official evidence for criminal activities but he was widely considered to be one of the bosses of the mafia. Former employees claim that he was involved in a prostitution ring. He was shot dead in front of his office in Sofia on 3 July 2003 (a failed assassination attempt had been made in 1997).
 Konstantin "Samokovetsa" Dimitrov - Drug smuggler and billionaire, connected with VIS. Shot dead in Amsterdam on 7 December 2003.
 Dimitar Hristov, a.k.a. Mitko the Little One - Shot dead on 4 June 2004 in a cafe together with his bodyguards Kaloyan Savov and Zhivko Mitev by two hitmen disguised as Eastern Orthodox priests.
 Milcho Bonev, a.k.a. "Baj Mile" - One of the founders of SIC. He was believed to be an important link in the drug trafficking and distribution network in the Balkans, and was investigated by Bulgarian and Serbian special services. He had survived an earlier assassination attempt in September 2001. Bonev was shot dead in broad daylight in a garden-restaurant in Sofia on 20 July 2004 together with five of his bodyguards.
 Georgi Iliev - Brother of Vasil Iliev and head of VIS2. Shot dead in front of his club at Sunny Beach, Bulgaria on 25 August 2005.
 Emil Kyulev - Former elite swimmer and banker, connected with SIC. Shot dead while driving down Boulevard Bulgaria in Sofia on 26 October 2005.
 Anton Miltenov, a.k.a. "The Beak" - Drug smuggler, right-hand man of Konstantin "Samokovetsa" Dimitrov. Shot dead in a popular cafe in the centre of Sofia on 30 October 2005 (together with his co-workers Ivan "The Ghost" Todorov and Nikolay "The Eyeglasses" Dobrev). An earlier attempt on his life had been made on 28 June 2002.
 Ivan Todorov, a.k.a. "The Doctor" - Drug smuggler. Shot dead on 22 February 2006. He had survived a previous assassination attempt on 18 April 2003 in which his Mercedes was blown up while driving down a main boulevard in Sofia.
 Georgi Stoev - Former wrestler, connected with VIS and SIC. Had written nine books about Bulgaria's mafia bosses, many of whom he claimed to know personally. Shot dead in Sofia on 7 April 2008.
Zlatko Baretata (The Berret) - Notorious Bulgarian mobster. He suffered an assassination attempt on the stairs of the Sofia Court House in Downtown Sofia on 29-January 2013. Despite being shot multiple times, he survived the attack.

Other mafia-related assassinations
 Georgi Kalapatirov - Chairman of Bulgaria's football team Lokomotiv Plovdiv, shot dead in 1995.
 Georgi Prodanov - Chairman of Bulgaria's football team Lokomotiv Plovdiv, shot dead in 1995.
 Petar Petrov - Chairman of Bulgaria's football team Lokomotiv Plovdiv, shot dead in 1998.
 Nikolai Popov - Chairman of Bulgaria's football team Lokomotiv Plovdiv, shot dead in 2005.
 Alexander Tasev - Chairman of Bulgaria's football team Lokomotiv Plovdiv, shot dead in May 2007.
 Yanko Yankov - Mayor of Elin Pelin, shot dead in January 2007.
 Dimitar Yankov - Chairman of the Municipality Council of the seaside town of Nesebar, shot dead in May 2007.
 Manol Velev - Bulgarian notorious businessman-mobster with close links with the BSP. Murder attempt on 6 November2007.
 Borislav Georgiev - Director of AtomEnergoRemont, one of the major Bulgarian energy companies. Shot dead in April 2008.
 Petar Lupov - Prominent lawyer, involved in the defense team for a group of shareholders of the former Trakya Bank against DZI Bank. Shot dead on 25 March 2009 in Veliko Tarnovo.
 Bobi Tsankov - Controversial investigative journalist, criminal writer, radio and TV host. Shot dead in downtown Sofia, January 2010.

Australia
Nik Radev - Russian mafia enforcer

Judicial prosecution and fight against criminal networks
In 2006, the EU dispatched the head of Germany's criminal investigation office Klaus Jansen to assess Bulgaria's progress in fighting organized crime. He concluded that Bulgaria had failed to implement modern principles and methods in the fight against crime, criticising among other things the low commitment of the country's police force to combat organized crime. The report further observed that "indictments, prosecutions, trials, convictions and deterrent sentences remain rare in the fight against high-level corruption" and described efforts to fight crime as "a total mess". Jensen also suggested that European police information passed to Sofia could end up with criminals. In a reaction to the report, Interior Minister Rumen Petkov described the findings as exaggerated and protested against Jansen's way of presenting the situation in Bulgaria which, in his words, demonstrated his incompetence.

In the Bulgarian judicial system, the Prosecutor General is elected by a qualified majority of two-thirds from all the members of the Supreme Judicial Council and is appointed by the President of the Republic. The Supreme Judicial Council is in charge of the self-administration and organisation of the Judiciary.

List of Prosecutor Generals in Bulgaria post-1989:
 Ivan Geshev - in office since 18 December 2019
 Sotir Tsatsarov
 Boris Velchev
 Nikola Filchev
 Ivan Tatarchev
 Martin Gounev

History
See also: History of Bulgaria since 1989

Much of the post-Communist Bulgarian mafia originates from the professional sportsmen and especially the wrestlers of the Communist period (1944–1989). The Iliev brothers, Krasimir "Big Margin" Marinov and Iliya Pavlov were all students of the school for future champions "Olympic Hopes" (Bulgarian: "Олимпийски надежди").

In post-1990 Bulgaria, the word борец ("wrestler") came to denote a mafia man (a common synonym is мутра (mutra), literally "mug, or mean mug"). The image of the Bulgarian "mug", including a sturdy muscular build, a black suit, sunglasses, a shaved head, and golden jewellery, became synonymous with the so-called Bulgarian "transition" (to market economy). These wrestlers were also known to own expensive cars with license plates with double numbers so that strangers would recognize their status as elite criminals.

The wrestlers came to control much of Bulgarian business, so the word "businessman" acquired similar undertones. The wrestlers also infiltrated Bulgarian politics (it was often alleged that SIC and VIS were connected to the two main parties of the 1990s, the Bulgarian Socialist Party and the Union of Democratic Forces, respectively). As the UDF government (1997–2001) made the registration of the criminal insurance businesses more difficult, much of their networks and personnel were integrated into existing legal insurance firms, while at the same time the principal bosses moved the focus of their attention to smuggling, trade and privatization.

During the government of National Movement Simeon II (2001–2005), assassinations became especially common. Throughout the Post-Communist period, evidence has often surfaced to show the close ties between the criminal networks and politicians and officials. UDF chief prosecutor Ivan Tatarchev allegedly recreated together with Ivo Karamanski, NMS-II finance minister Milen Velchev was photographed playing cards with Ivan "The Doctor" Todorov, and BSP interior minister Rumen Petkov negotiated with the shadowy "Galev brothers".

See also
Multigroup
Naglite
VIS

General:
 Crime in Bulgaria

References

WikiLeaks Cables - Bulgarian mafia
Bulgarian mafia / crime pages & videos

Further reading
 
 
 Centre for the Study of Democracy (2003) The Drug Market In Bulgaria
 Misha Glenny, The Rebirth Of History: Eastern Europe in the Age of Democracy (Penguin Books, 1990)
 Misha Glenny, The Fall of Yugoslavia (Penguin Books, 1992)
 Misha Glenny, The Balkans: Nationalism, War and the Great Powers, 1804-1999 (Penguin Books, 1999)
 Misha Glenny, McMafia: A Journey Through the Global Criminal Underworld (The Bodley Head in the UK and Alfred A. Knopf in the US, 2008)

External links

Mafia
Organized crime by ethnic or national origin
Transnational organized crime
Organised crime groups in Australia
European-Australian culture
Organised crime groups in Belgium
Mafia
Organized crime groups in Greece
Organised crime groups in the Netherlands
Organised crime groups in Italy
Organised crime groups in Spain
Organized crime groups in the United States